Omuma town is the headquarters of Oru East local government area of Imo State in the Southeastern part of Nigeria. It is one of the oldest towns in Imo State. Omuma is located at latitude 5.560° N and longitude 6.972° E. Its boundary to the west is Mgbidi, to the east by Akatta and Attah, to the north by Eleh and Nempi and to the south by Amiri and Otulu. Omuma has four communities: Abia-Omuma, Ozuh-Omuma, Umuhu-Omuma, and Etiti-Omuma.
The current Imo state governor, Hope Uzodinma, is from Omuma.

Religion 
Christianity is the dominant religion in Omuma.

Culture 
The culture of Omuma is typical of Igbo cultures, being steeped in Igbo art and Igbo music. Some cultural activities and festivals are associated with ancient tribal gods and rites, but since the spread of Christianity, many are no longer performed.

Festival 
The new yam festival is a solemn occasion and starts with the planting season in March when the chief priest and elders start the planting of yams. Before the first yam is planted, elders pay homage to their traditional ruler or chief, the Dede Igbo, who is the custodian of tradition and the ancestral father of the Omuma Igbo people.

Top members of the Igbo people, such as high chiefs, titleholders, respected elders, and important personalities in the community, form an entourage to make the journey to the Dede. When this entourage arrives at the Ezeonomobi Igbo, the members are usually received by the leader according to cultural tradition, by presenting them locally brewed palm wine, kola nut, and white clay, which is first offered to the gods as supplication before the visitors.

The group conducts brief discussions and prayers. The conventional calendar puts the planting season in January, while the Igbo calendar, which is agrarian, is called the first Eke and starts in February, known as Onwa Mmiri Nda Afo.

In Igbo areas, yam is an important economic crop, highly favored, and a regular staple in most homes. The yam is considered the chief crop and forerunner of other crops in the region. The planting season begins in the first week of February and the crop usually takes six months to mature, making the festival period between late July and early August when the valuable crop is harvested.

Education

Secondary schools 
Divine Favour Secondary School, Omuma
Omuma Technical College, Omuma
Omuma community school, Omuma
Uche Stenography Academy, Umuhu-Omuma
Holy Trinity Secondary School, Omuma
Wisdom Secondary School, Omuma

Primary schools 
Ozuh primary school, Ozuh-Omuma
Abia Central School, Abia-Omuma
Community Primary School, Amaodum Etiti-Omuma
Umuhu Primary School, Umuhu-Omuma
Powerline Primary School, Abia-Omuma
Omuma Central School, Omuma

Higher Institution 
Imo State Polytechnic, Omuma

Economy 
Omuma produces many agricultural products, such as yams, cassava, taro, ona, maize, rubber, and palm. Omuma also has crude oil and natural gas reserves, like most of the Igbo regions. Notable industries in Omuma include bread factories, bottled water companies, sawmills, and palm oil mills. The Omuma market, popularly known as "Orie Omuma", is the biggest in the Oru East L.G.A., attracting people from all over southeast Nigeria and beyond.

References

Local Government Areas of Nigeria
Geography of Nigeria